Yoshihiro Suzuki (鈴木 義広, born January 5, 1983, in Mannō, Kagawa Prefecture) is a retired Japanese professional baseball pitcher. He played for the Chunichi Dragons in Japan's Nippon Professional Baseball for the entirety of his career.

Since 2015, he has been employed as the Dragons scorer.

External links

NBP.com

1983 births
Living people
Baseball people from Kagawa Prefecture
Japanese baseball players
Nippon Professional Baseball pitchers
Chunichi Dragons players